The 2018 European Junior Judo Championships is an edition of the European Junior Judo Championships, organised by the European Judo Union.It was held in Sofia, Bulgaria from 13 to 16 September 2018. The final day of competition featured a mixed team event, won by team Russia.

Medal summary

Medal table

Men's events

Women's events

Source Results

Mixed

Source Results

References

External links
 

 U21
European Junior Judo Championships
European Championships, U21
Judo
Judo competitions in Bulgaria
Judo
Judo, World Championships U21